Luigi Scattini (17 May 1927 – 12 July 2010) was an Italian film director and screenwriter.

Scattini graduated in law, then he began his career as a journalist and a film critic for several weekly magazines such as Gente and Oggi. In the 1960s he entered the cinema industry as a director of ephemeral films and mondo documentaries. He also directed several feature films, including the comedy War Italian Style with Buster Keaton. He was also active as a producer, a film editor and a dubbing director. He was the father of the actress Monica Scattini.

Selected filmography
 Primitive Love (1964)
 War Italian Style (1966)
 Ring Around the World (1966)
 The Glass Sphinx (1967)
 Sweden: Heaven and Hell (1968)
 La ragazza dalla pelle di luna (1972)
 The Body (1974)
 Twilight of Love (1977)

References

External links
 

1927 births
2010 deaths
Italian film directors
Film people from Turin
Italian screenwriters
Italian male screenwriters